Johann Leo (born 1 March 1958) is an Austrian judoka. He competed in the men's lightweight event at the 1980 Summer Olympics.

References

External links
 

1958 births
Living people
Austrian male judoka
Olympic judoka of Austria
Judoka at the 1980 Summer Olympics
People from Kufstein
Sportspeople from Tyrol (state)
20th-century Austrian people